Mahanoy Creek is a  long tributary of the Susquehanna River in Schuylkill County and Northumberland County, in Pennsylvania, in the United States. It has eleven officially named tributaries, of which six are direct tributaries and five are sub-tributaries. These include seven creeks and four runs.

Many of the tributaries of Mahanoy Creek have been impacted by mining, including Zerbe Run, Shenandoah Creek, and North Mahanoy Creek. Schwaben Creek and Little Mahanoy Creek are the only large tributaries that are not affected by mining. Many of the upper tributaries are in the Western Middle Anthracite Field. In March 2001, the officially named tributary with the highest discharge was Zerbe Run at Dornsife, while the tributary with the lowest discharge was Lost Creek. In August of that year, Little Mahanoy Creek had the highest discharge and North Mahanoy Creek had the lowest discharge (0 discharge). In March 2001, the pH ranged from 4.7 for Lost Creek to 8.4 for Schwaben Creek. Some streams were downstream of abandoned mine drainage discharges accounting for their acidity.

In 2001, Schwaben Creek was the only named tributary of Mahanoy Creek that was found to contain fish; it had twenty different species. However, every officially named tributary save for Rattling Run had macroinvertebrates. The Hilsenhoff Biotic Index values for macroinvertebrate families in all other tributaries ranged from 10 for Shenandoah Creek at Lost Creek to 3.76 for Schwaben Creek; lower values are ideal (values under 3.75 are considered "excellent", while values over 7.25 are considered "very poor"). Although Mahanoy Creek is classified as a Warmwater Fishery, all of its tributaries are classified as Coldwater Fisheries, save for Schwaben Creek and its tributaries Mouse Creek and Middle Creek, which are Trout Stocked Fisheries. Little Mahanoy Creek is the only named tributary to contain wild trout, but it and part of Schwaben Creek are stocked with trout.

Tributaries of Mahanoy Creek

Tributaries of Schwaben Creek

Tributaries of Little Mahanoy Creek

Tributaries of Shenandoah Creek

See also
List of rivers of Pennsylvania

References

External links

Mahonay